Sidey is an English surname. Notable people with this surname include:

 Hugh Sidey (1927–2005), American journalist
 Jenni Sidey-Gibbons (born 1988), Canadian astronaut, engineer and academic
 Norman Sidey (1907–1969), English football player
 Rory Sidey (born 1986), Australian rugby union player
 Stuart Sidey (1908–2007), New Zealand politician
 Thomas Sidey (1863–1933), New Zealand politician

See also
 Sidey, Manokwari Regency, Indonesia